Anne Mattila (born 31 May 1984 in Karvia) is a Finnish singer and painter. Active since 1999, she has released sixteen albums, six of which were certified platinum in Finland.

References

External links

 Official Website
 Anne Mattila on Discogs

Living people
1984 births
21st-century Finnish women singers
Finnish painters